Alexandra Dinu (born 3 January 1981, Bucharest, Romania) is a Romanian actress and television presenter who has also appeared in films in Italy and America.

Early life
Dinu studied at the Jean Monnet language school in Bucharest.

Career
Her first appearance on television was as a host in 1999 as part of a program for Romanian TVR2 and, shortly after for TVR1. As an actress, Dinu is known in Europe for Second-Hand (2005), Garcea si oltenii (2001) and Examen (2003).

In 2017 Dinu appeared in Bullet Head, a crime thriller starring Adrien Brody, Antonio Banderas, and John Malkovich. She appeared with Dave Batista and Pierce Brosnan in action film Final Score, set during the final match played by West Ham United 
at their Boleyn Ground preposterously hosting a European semi-final, as Tatiana, a terrorist kidnapper.

Dinu appears as Agent Ross in 211 with Nicolas Cage.
A film written and directed by Roberto Leoni entitled The Serpent's Gift, in which she participated together with Dinu and Guglielmo Scilla, will be released in 2020.

Personal life
From 2001 to 2003 she was married to the footballer Adrian Mutu with whom she has a son, Mario. Mutu said the depression he fell into following his divorce from Dinu led to the cocaine use which caused his sacking by Chelsea FC in 2004, despite first claiming he only failed a drugs test due to supplements designed to improve his sexual performance.

References

External links
 

1981 births
Living people
Romanian film actresses
Romanian television presenters
Romanian women television presenters